Palmer Burch (March 7, 1907 – June 28, 1990) was an American politician who served as the Treasurer of Colorado from 1971 to 1975. He previously served in the Colorado House of Representatives from 1947 to 1949 and from 1951 to 1959 and from 1961 to 1971.

References

1907 births
1990 deaths
Republican Party members of the Colorado House of Representatives
State treasurers of Colorado
20th-century American politicians